Palace Skateboards (or Palace) is a London-based skateboarding and clothing brand established in 2009. The brand was founded by Levent Tanju and his skate team, the Palace Wayward Boys Choir, along with Gareth Skewis. Palace focuses on skatewear with heavy 90s and pop culture influences alongside VHS style clothing advertisements. The skate team promotes their branded content and skate videos. Palace has flagship stores in London, New York, Los Angeles and Tokyo, and launches new products every Friday morning during their five seasonal periods: Spring, Summer, Autumn, Winter and Ultimo. The rising brand has gained popularity within the streetwear community for its uniqueness and limited availability.

History 
In an interview with Glasschord Magazine, Founder Lev Tanju said “I had a decade gap after college, just skating and doing fun shit. Then one day I decided that I was a bum and I had to do something. I started designing some board graphics for people I had been living with. Then half way through designing them I thought to myself that maybe I should just start a skate company,".

Tanju wanted a triangular theme for his newly created brand. The Palace name references the group's ironic nicknames for the houses they resided in, which were usually worn down. The logo was created by Marc Jacobs' design director, Fergus "Fergadelic" Purcell. Purcell stated in an interview with Dazed Digital that he wanted to make a logo that had connotations of the infinite and of constant flux and movement. Purcell used a Penrose triangle with the word 'Palace' written on each side. The logo is referred to as the "Tri-Ferg Logo."

Early in the development of the brand, clothing and skateboards were sold in local skate shops and boutiques in the London area. As Palace business grew, they began to sell goods in Supreme stores in New York and Los Angeles. In 2012, the company received their first award as 'European Skate Brand of the Year' in Berlin for growth and professionalism as a small brand.

After achieving some recognition, the brand went on to collaborate with Umbro in late 2012, Reebok in late 2013, and Adidas in late 2014. Alongside these collaborations, Palace depended on the Dover Street Market, End Clothing and occasional pop-up shops around England to stock and distribute their merchandise.

In 2015, Palace announced that they would open their first store in London. In 2017, they opened their second store in New York. The store's grand opening was announced in a promotional advert featuring Jonah Hill and Leo Fitzpatrick. Late in 2018, Palace opened their third store in Tokyo, Japan. And in May 2019, on Melrose Avenue in Los Angeles, Palace opened their fourth store.

Skate team
Palace's current team, as of 2021, includes:

Lucien Clarke
Rory Milanes
Benny Fairfax
Lucas Puig
Chewy Cannon
Danny Brady
Olly Todd
Heitor da Silva
Jamal Smith
Charlie Birch
Kyle Wilson
Jahmir Brown
Shawn Powers
Ville Wester

Work and collaborations 
Palace regularly collaborates with Adidas to produce clothing and footwear. These collections usually consist of casualwear, however, Adidas sometimes incorporate their sport-specific divisions into the collaborations. This includes collections for tennis (worn by Adidas-sponsored players at Wimbledon 2018) and golf. Whilst Adidas were the kit manufacturer for Juventus F.C., a fourth kit was released for the club, featuring Palace branding. The kit was worn by the likes of Cristiano Ronaldo and Paulo Dybala during matches. Palace has also collaborated multiple times with Reebok, of which Adidas is the parent company.

Palace has collaborated with clothing brands such as Avirex, Umbro, Salomon, Dover Street Market, Jean-Charles de Castelbajac, Ralph Lauren,  Rapha, Evisu, Moschino and Anarchic Adjustment. However, there have also been collaborations with brands not usually associated with clothing or fashion, which produce co-branded products such as Cîroc Vodka and Winmau darts. However sometimes clothing collections are made with product or lifestyle brands, as was the case when Palace collaborated with Stella Artois in 2021.

Palace has also released collaborations with singer Elton John, creating a range of apparel, including skateboards. The brand recently released a collaboration with Calvin Klein where a video was released to promote this collaboration entitled 'Palace CK1', and featured famed actor Willem Dafoe.

Gore-Tex fabric has been licensed for use by Palace to make various waterproof jackets and trousers.

In popular culture 
Notable people who have worn Palace clothing in public include Travis Scott, Jonah Hill, Drake, Kanye West, JV, Jay Z, ASAP Rocky, Asim Chaudhry, Rihanna, Justin Bieber, Freddie Gibbs, Kylie Jenner, Dua Lipa, Playboi Carti, and The Weeknd.

The brand has become recognisable amongst skaters and those interested in fashion. The brand's clothing has featured on the cover of several notable magazines.

The brand work closely with an array of brands and famous individuals, helping to increase their notoriety.

Awards 
The 2018 Fashion Urban Luxe, category nominated the brand alongside street wear stalwart Supreme, Off-White, Alyx, and Marine Serre
The 2012 'European Skate Brand of the Year' at the BRIGHT Tradeshow Award in Berlin.

References

External links
 Official website
 Palace Drop Community Website
 Skateboard Culture Website

Clothing companies established in 2009
Retail companies established in 2009
Skateboarding companies